Peter Murko (born 3 May 1984) is a Slovenian  football defender who plays for SD Starse

References

External links
PrvaLiga profile 

1984 births
Living people
Sportspeople from Maribor
Slovenian footballers
Association football defenders
NK Drava Ptuj (2004) players
Slovenian PrvaLiga players
Slovenian expatriate footballers
Slovenian expatriate sportspeople in Austria
Expatriate footballers in Austria
NK Zavrč players